Tytus is a human name that can serve as a given name or surname.

People with the first name of Tytus

Tytus Czyżewski (1880-1945), Polish painter, art theoretician, Futurist poet, playwright, member of the Polish Formists, and Colorist
Tytus Maksymilian Huber (also known as Maksymilian Tytus Huber, 1872 - 1950), Polish mechanical engineer, educator and scientist
Tytus Działyński (1796-1861, son of Ksawery, father to Jan Kanty), Polish political activist and protector of arts
Tytus Chałubiński (1820 - 1889), Polish physician, co-founder of the Polish Tatra Society
Tytus Howard (born 1996), American football player

People with a surname of Tytus 
John B. Tytus, American inventor

Fictional character
Tytus, Romek i A'Tomek a Polish comic book series
Tytus (Masters of the Universe) a giant in the Masters of the Universe mythos

Given names